John Frost Nugent (June 28, 1868September 18, 1931) was an American attorney and Democratic politician from Idaho. He served three years in the United States Senate, from 1918 to 1921.

Early life and education 
Born in La Grande, Oregon while his parents were visiting, Nugent attended public schools in Silver City, Idaho, where his father, Edward, was a judge.

Career 
He worked in mines in Idaho and Australia, and read law. Nugent was admitted to the bar in 1898, commencing practice back in Silver City, and was prosecuting attorney of Owyhee County from 1899 to 1906.

Following the murder of former governor Frank Steunenberg in late 1905, Nugent joined Clarence Darrow in defending three members of the Western Federation of Miners: Charles Moyer, president of the union, Bill Haywood, its secretary, and George Pettibone, a former member. All three were acquitted, while prime suspect Harry Orchard was convicted and died at the 
state penitentiary in 1954.

In January 1918, Governor Moses Alexander appointed Nugent to the U.S. Senate to succeed Republican James Brady, who died in office. Nugent defeated former Governor Frank Gooding by 970 votes in a special election that November to finish the term. In the Senate, Nugent served as chairman of the Committee on Fisheries.

Nugent faced Gooding again in 1920 for a full six-year term, but was defeated. Nugent resigned in January, prior to the end of his term in March, to accept an appointment from lame duck President Woodrow Wilson to the Federal Trade Commission. He served until 1927.

Nugent ran a third time for Senate in 1926, but finished third behind Gooding and Progressive candidate H. F. Samuels. He resumed the practice of law in Washington, D.C. and remained in the area until his death after a brief illness in 1931 at age 63.

Personal life 
Nugent, his wife Adelma (1870–1943), and their son George (1896–1979) are buried in Cedar Hill Cemetery in Suitland, Maryland.

References

External links 

1868 births
1931 deaths
People from La Grande, Oregon
Democratic Party United States senators from Idaho
Idaho Democrats
American prosecutors
American lawyers admitted to the practice of law by reading law
Federal Trade Commission personnel
Woodrow Wilson administration personnel
Harding administration personnel
Coolidge administration personnel